A pony glass may mean one of two types of small glassware:
 A quarter-pint glass of beer: , metricated to 140ml in Australia.
 A small, stemmed glass of about one ounce, similar to a stemmed shot glass. Used for liqueurs or cordials, hence also called a "cordial glass" or "liqueur glass".
 A bar measure that is half of a jigger, used to measure a cordial. A pony traditionally held , and is attached to the bottom of a jigger measure, which held . In modern times, however, both the size and ratio of the jigger to pony varies widely.

Name
The name "pony" is due to the small size, and dates to the 19th century. Similar terms include pony bottle and pony keg.

History
The pony as a measure reached its apex around the end of the 19th century, which also happened to be a golden age of barware.

References

Drinking glasses
Beer glassware
Drinkware
Alcohol measurement